Last Hero in China is a 1993 Hong Kong martial arts film written and directed by Wong Jing. It is a derivative of the Once Upon a Time in China film series, and unlike other imitations, it can be considered a spin-off or parody to some extent. It was released after the first three films in the Once Upon a Time in China franchise. The film starred Jet Li as Chinese martial arts master and folk hero of Cantonese ethnicity, Wong Fei-hung and the action choreography was done by Yuen Woo-ping. However Last Hero in China differs greatly in tone from the Once Upon a Time in China films as it contains stronger elements of violence and broader, more slapstick, comedy. The film contains some Easter eggs, such as a Lifebuoy poster in the 19th century, a staff of the Monkey King, a guandao and Ne Zha's Universe Ring.

Alternative titles
 Claws of Steel (DVD release 22 Jan. 2003)
 Deadly China Hero (DVD release 27 Jan. 2004)
 Iron Rooster vs. Centipede (DVD release 7 Jan. 2005)

Plot
Wong Fei-Hung now has his own school of Kung fu, but its premises have become too small for his numerous students. Two of his disciples, Leung Foon and "Bucktooth" So succeed in finding an agreement with the owner of a vacant house. The school thus changes location... Unfortunately, Wong Fei-Hung's new school building is next to a "love hotel", which is unacceptable for the Master, although less so for his young students. What's worse, a new general wants Wong gone at any cost, for fear that he will reveal the general's dirty secrets...

Cast 
 Jet Li as Wong Fei-hung
 Alan Chui Chung-San as Lui Yat-siu
 Sharla Cheung as Ti Yin-er
 Dicky Cheung as "Bucktooth" So
 Bryan Leung as Leung Foon
 Anita Yuen as Miss Nine
 Natalis Chan as Mass Tar Wong
 Kingdom Yuen as San Gu
 Linda Cheung as hooker
 Gordon Liu as Master Liu Hung
 Dion Lam as convicted robber and rapist
 Wong Tin-lam as member of Moral Reform Society
 Pak Man-biu as Uncle Cheung
 Szema Wah Lung as member of four com. associations
 Law Ho-kai as Robert
 Chung Fat as Yuen Lung
 Yuen Miu as Yuen Po
 Jimmy Au as Yuen Fu
 Julie Lee as woman chased through the woods
 Jackson Ng as young master molesting Yin-er
 Jue Tit-who as Yin-er's father
 Isabel Leung as hooker
 Gam Biu as magistrate
 Chun Kwai-bo as Nun Yah's bad monk
 Chu Tau as constable who beat Mass Tar Wong
 Chow Gam-kong as young master's servant
 Lui Tat as master of Nun Yah Temple
 Ku Tin-yi as hooker
 Roy Filler as Benjamin
 Chan Siu-wah as monk
 Ling Chi-hung as landlord's representative
 Lee Hang as constable
 Lam Kwok-git as constable / Master Wong's disciple
 Cheung Chun-hung as Master Wong's disciple
 So Wai-naam as Master Wong's disciple
 Ho Si-wan
 Lam Foo-wai

References

External links
 
 
 

Films directed by Wong Jing
Hong Kong martial arts comedy films
Hong Kong action comedy films
1990s Cantonese-language films
1993 films
Kung fu films
1993 action comedy films
1993 martial arts films
Hong Kong slapstick comedy films
1990s Hong Kong films